Ben Marcus (born October 11, 1967) is an American author and professor at Columbia University. He has written four books of fiction. His stories, essays, and reviews have appeared in publications including Harper's, The New Yorker, The Paris Review, Granta, The New York Times, GQ, Salon, McSweeney's, Time, and Conjunctions. He is also the fiction editor of The American Reader. His latest book, Notes From The Fog: Stories, was published by Alfred A. Knopf in August 2018.

Life
Marcus grew up in Austin, the son of a retired mathematician and the literary critic and Virginia Woolf scholar Jane Marcus. He received his bachelor's degree in philosophy from New York University and an MFA from Brown University. His father is Jewish and his mother is of Irish Catholic background; Marcus had a Bar Mitzvah. Marcus also has two kids, Delia and Solomon, born in 2004 and 2008.

Marcus is a professor at Columbia University School of the Arts, and he lives in New York City. He is married to the writer Heidi Julavits. He is the editor of The Anchor Book of New American Short Stories, and the fiction editor at The American Reader. For several years he was the fiction editor of Fence.

Influences
Marcus' influences include Virginia Woolf, Franz Kafka, Donald Barthelme, Richard Yates, Flannery O'Connor, Thomas Bernhard, Padgett Powell, J. M. Coetzee, David Ohle, Kōbō Abe, Gary Lutz, and George Saunders.

Awards and honours
2014 Frank O'Connor International Short Story Award shortlist Leaving the Sea
2014 Jewish Quarterly-Wingate Prize, shortlist, The Flame Alphabet
2013 Guggenheim Fellow
2013 Berlin Prize Fellowship
2009 Creative Capital Award for Innovative Literature
2008 Morton Dauwen Zabel Award from the American Academy of Arts and Letters
1999 Whiting Award
2000 National Endowment for the Arts, Fellowship in fiction, Creative writing 
Pushcart Prize (three times)

Bibliography

Novels 
Notable American Women (2002)
The Flame Alphabet (2012)

Short fiction 
Collections
The Age of Wire and String (1995), short stories
Leaving the Sea (2014), short stories
New American Stories (2015), short stories
Notes from the Fog, Knopf, (2018),  short stories
Stories
"Elevation of the Prison Bed", The Barcelona Review, 1997
The Father Costume (2002), novella with art by Matthew Ritchie
 
"The Dark Arts", The New Yorker, May 20, 2013
"The Loyalty Protocol", Granta 122: Betrayal, Winter 2013 (Subscription Required)
"The Grow Light Blues", The New Yorker, June 22, 2015
Tool, a short story written as a review of a woo
"Cold Little Bird", New Yorker, October 19, 2015

Other works 
 Text for the photography book by Kahn & Selesnick Scotlandfuturebog (2002). Aperture Foundation, New York City, .
The Anchor Book of New American Short Stories (2004), editor
The Moors (2010)
Chemical Seuss, from benmarcus.com
Thomas Bernhard, from benmarcus.com
On the Lyric Essay, from benmarcus.com
Why experimental fiction threatens to destroy publishing, Jonathan Franzen, and life as we know it: A correction, a response to an essay by Mr. Franzen, from Harpers.org

References

External links
Official website
Powell's Books interview with Ben Marcus
Random House Interview with Ben Marcus
Profile at The Whiting Foundation
Electronic Book Review reviews Notable American Women
Ben Marcus at the American Academy Berlin as Mary Ellen von der Heyden Fiction Fellow

1967 births
Living people
Jewish American novelists
Postmodern literature
Postmodern writers
Brown University alumni
Place of birth missing (living people)
Writers from Chicago
Columbia University faculty
American male novelists
Novelists from Illinois
Novelists from New York (state)
Harper's Magazine people
21st-century American Jews